Viserion may refer to:
 Viserion (Game of Thrones), one of the three dragons hatched by Daenerys Targaryen in the Game of Thrones franchise
 Viserion, one of the three dragons hatched by Daenerys Targaryen in the A Song of Ice and Fire books by George R. R. Martin
 Pseudocalotes viserion, Viserion’s false garden lizard, a species of agamid lizard, found in Malaysia
 Cryodrakon viserion, a name originally considered by Michael Habib for Cryodrakon boreas